Budanyar (Buźanyar) is a rural locality (a village) in Gayniyamaksky Selsoviet, Alsheyevsky District, Bashkortostan, Russia. The population was 40 as of 2010. There are 2  streets.

Geography 
Budanyar is located 58 km southwest of Rayevsky (the district's administrative centre) by road. Gayniyamak is the nearest rural locality.

References 

Rural localities in Alsheyevsky District